Marie Wainwright (May 8, 1853 – August 17, 1923) was an American stage and sometimes screen actress. She achieved the bulk of her fame on the Victorian stage.
Her parents were Commodore J.M. Wainwright and Maria Wainwright (nee Page). She was educated in France and made her first stage appearance in 1877 in Romeo and Juliet. She later was leading lady for Edwin Booth, Lawrence Barrett and Tommaso Salvini. She acted in the classics and high drama until the turn of the century, then began appearing in more contemporary plays. Later in life she made an attempt at silent film acting, making just three films. She died in Scranton Pennsylvania in 1923.

Selected filmography
Social Hypocrites (1918), as Maria, Duchess of St. Keverne
Secret Strings (1918), as Mrs. de Giles
Polly With a Past (1920), as Mrs. Van Zile

References

External links

portraits of Marie Wainwright, photo#1, ..photo#2(Univ. of Louisville, Macauley Theatre collection)
 youthful portrait(Wayback Machine)
1884 Between the Acts cigarettes

1853 births
1923 deaths
Actresses from Philadelphia
19th-century American actresses
American stage actresses
American silent film actresses
20th-century American actresses